Bak sju hav is a 1991 Norwegian drama film directed by Saeed Anjum and Espen Thorstenson. Aslam (Sajid M. Hussain) is 8 years old when his father leaves their home in Lahore, Pakistan, for Norway. After one year, Aslam and the rest of the family follow.

External links
 
 Bak sju hav at Filmweb.no (Norwegian)
 Bak sju hav at the Norwegian Film Institute

1991 films
1991 drama films
Norwegian drama films